Baraúna  may refer to:
Baraúna, Paraíba, Brazil
Baraúna, Rio Grande do Norte, Brazil
 Barauna Kalan, a town in Auraiya district in the Indian state of Uttar Pradesh
 a Brazilian name for the quebracho wood